Richard Andrew Clifton Allanby (born 26 July 1971 in Hobart, Tasmania) is a former Australian cricketer who has played for Tasmania. Richard attended the Australian Cricket Academy in 1994 and toured to New Zealand with them in 1994/95. He is the younger brother of former Tasmanian first class player Nick Allanby.

See also
 List of Tasmanian representative cricketers

External links
Cricinfo Profile

1971 births
Living people
Australian cricketers
Tasmania cricketers
Cricketers from Hobart